Qusqu Qhawarina (Quechua qusqu boundary stone; nucleus; navel; heap of earth and stones; bed, dry bed of a lake, Qusqu Cusco (a city), qhawarina, qhawana viewpoint, also spelled Cuzcoccahuarina) is a mountain in the Andes of Peru, about  high. It is located in the Cusco Region, Canchis Province, Checacupe District. Qusqu Qhawarina lies south of a lake named Waka Quta (or Wak'a Quta, also spelled Huacasccota).

References

Mountains of Peru
Mountains of Cusco Region